Enteromius yeiensis is a species of ray-finned fish in the genus Enteromius known from Chad and Sudan.

References 

 

Enteromius
Fish described in 1926
Taxa named by Sigurd Johnsen